Too Much, Too Late is novel written by Marc Spitz that was originally released on February 28, 2006 by Three Rivers Press.

Synopsis
Reunited more than a decade after their brief flirtation with fame in the early 1990s, the middle-aged members of the Ohio-based Jane Ashers suddenly find themselves hitting the big time, with a new record deal, a hit single, fame, fans, and a tour, that transforms their dream into a nightmare of colliding egos, family pressures, and too much success too late.

References
 "Kirkus Review"
 "Book Reporter Review"

External links
 Too Much, Too Late at Three Rivers Press

2006 novels
Novels set in Ohio
Novels about music
Three Rivers Press books